Philippe Chassaing (born 18 May 1972) is a French politician representing La République En Marche! and Territories of Progress. He was elected to the French National Assembly on 18 June 2017, representing the department of Dordogne.

See also
 2017 French legislative election

References

1972 births
Living people
People from Albi
La République En Marche! politicians
Territories of Progress politicians
Deputies of the 15th National Assembly of the French Fifth Republic
Politicians from Occitania (administrative region)